Hits, Rarities & Remixes is a compilation album by A Tribe Called Quest. It features two previously unreleased songs ("Mr. Incognito" and "The Night He Got Caught") as well as remixes and some of the group's more familiar songs. It also contains songs that were featured in movie soundtracks.

Track listing
"Oh My God [Remix]"
"Award Tour"
"Can I Kick It?"
"One Two Shit" (featuring Busta Rhymes)
"Electric Relaxation"
"Mr. Incognito"
"I Left My Wallet in El Segundo"
"Check the Rhime"
"Lyrics to Go [Tumblin' Dice Remix]"
"Scenario" (featuring Leaders of the New School)
"Same Ol' Thing" (from Men in Black: The Album)
"Buggin' Out"
"Bonita Applebum"
"Jazz (We've Got)"
"Glamour & Glitz" (from The Show)
"Clap Your Hands"
"The Night He Got Caught"
"Peace, Prosperity & Paper" (from High School High)

Charts

References

A Tribe Called Quest albums
Hip hop compilation albums
Albums produced by J Dilla
Albums produced by Q-Tip (musician)
2003 compilation albums